"We Must Be In Love" is the title of a R&B single by Pure Soul. It was the first single from the band's debut album.  The single peaked at number-eleven at R&B radio in 1995.

Chart positions

References

1995 singles
1995 songs
Interscope Records singles